Yohanan Simon (November 3, 1905 – January 16, 1976) was a German-born Israeli painter.

Biography 
Yohanan Simon, painter was born in 1905, Berlin. From 1927 he lived mainly in France. Beginning in 1934 he worked in New York for the magazine Vogue. In 1936 he immigrated to Mandate Palestine. Until 1953 he was a member of Kibbutz Gan Shmuel. He executed a number of murals for Israeli ships, public buildings and hotels, including Bank of Israel offices in New York and a hotel in Côte d'Ivoire. He also illustrated books and designed stage sets.

Education 
 Max Beckmann Art School, Frankfurt
 Academy of Fine Arts, Munich
 1931–34 École des Beaux-Arts, Paris

Awards and prizes 
 1945–46 The Dizengoff Prize for Painting and Sculpture, Municipality of Tel Aviv-Yafo, Tel Aviv
 1951 Congress of Jewish Culture Prize, New York City
 1952 Zichron Yaakov Prize
 1953 The Dizengoff Prize for Painting and Sculpture, Municipality of Tel Aviv-Yafo, Tel Aviv
 1956 Israel Olympic Committee Prize
 1958 Ramat Gan Prize
 1960 Histadrut Prize
 1961 The Dizengoff Prize for Painting and Sculpture, Municipality of Tel Aviv-Yafo, Tel Aviv

Outdoor and Public Art 
 1951 Congress of Jewish Culture, New York City
 1956 Israel Olympic Committee

Selected exhibitions 
 1948 Venice Biennale
 1958 Venice Biennale
 1953 São Paulo

References

External links 
 
 
 
 Yohanan Simon biography from the Engel Gallery 

1905 births
1976 deaths
20th-century Israeli painters
German expatriates in France
German emigrants to Mandatory Palestine